Froggattimyia is a genus of parasitic flies in the family Tachinidae.

Species
Froggattimyia aurea Townsend, 1916
Froggattimyia carnei Colless, 2012
Froggattimyia coracina Colless, 2012
Froggattimyia fergusoni Malloch, 1934
Froggattimyia hirta Townsend, 1916
Froggattimyia macdonaldi Colless, 2012
Froggattimyia nicholsoni Malloch, 1934
Froggattimyia truncata Colless, 2012
Froggattimyia vicina Colless, 2012
Froggattimyia wentworthi Malloch, 1934
Froggattimyia woodorum Colless, 2012.

References

Diptera of Australasia
Exoristinae
Tachinidae genera
Taxa named by Charles Henry Tyler Townsend